Megan Lukan (born February 14, 1992) is a Canadian multi-sport athlete. Lukan switched to rugby from basketball after graduating in May 2015 from the University of Wisconsin–Green Bay, where she was a four-year starting guard for the Green Bay women's Division l basketball team. During her UWGB basketball career, Lukan set a number of records included most career assists since the team became a member of the NCAA's Division I and most minutes played during a career. Lukan is a Canadian rugby union player, who was named to Canada's first ever women's rugby sevens Olympic team at the 2016 Summer Olympics. In 2018, she was selected by the Canadian Olympic Committee and was sponsored to attend Smith School of Business MBA program at Queen's University. Lukan's younger sister Kaili Lukan also played basketball at University of Wisconsin-Green Bay and is a current member of the Canada women's national rugby sevens team.

Green Bay statistics

Source

References

External links
 

1992 births
Living people
Canadian female rugby union players
Sportspeople from Toronto
Basketball players from Toronto
Rugby sevens players at the 2016 Summer Olympics
Olympic rugby sevens players of Canada
Canada international rugby sevens players
Female rugby sevens players
Green Bay Phoenix women's basketball players
Olympic bronze medalists for Canada
Olympic medalists in rugby sevens
Medalists at the 2016 Summer Olympics
Canada international women's rugby sevens players